Plectiscidea is a genus of parasitoid wasps belonging to the family Ichneumonidae.

The genus has almost cosmopolitan distribution.

Species:
 Plectiscidea abdita (Forster, 1871) 
 Plectiscidea agitator (Forster, 1871)

References

Ichneumonidae
Ichneumonidae genera